Yan Panpan (born 5 February 1990) is a Chinese Paralympic powerlifter. He won the gold medal in the men's 97 kg event at the 2020 Summer Paralympics held in Tokyo, Japan.

References

Living people
1990 births
People from Cangzhou
Male powerlifters
Paralympic powerlifters of China
Powerlifters at the 2020 Summer Paralympics
Chinese powerlifters
Medalists at the 2020 Summer Paralympics
Paralympic gold medalists for China
Paralympic medalists in powerlifting
21st-century Chinese people